İrfan Atan (1 January 1928 – 12 April 2004) was a Turkish wrestler. He competed in the men's freestyle heavyweight at the 1952 Summer Olympics.

References

External links
 

1928 births
2004 deaths
Turkish male sport wrestlers
Olympic wrestlers of Turkey
Wrestlers at the 1952 Summer Olympics
Sportspeople from Adapazarı
World Wrestling Championships medalists